The Belgian National Road Race Championship is a cycling race which decides who will become Belgian national champion for the year to come. The men's record for most wins is currently held by one of the most successful Belgian sprinters, Tom Steels, who managed to take four road championship titles.

The winners of each event are awarded with a symbolic cycling jersey, which is black, yellow and red, like the national flag. These colours can be worn by the rider at other road racing events to show their status as national champion. The champion's stripes can be combined into a sponsored rider's team kit design for this purpose.

Multiple champions 

The following riders that have managed to win the Elite race more than once.

Men

Women

Men

Elite

Under 23

Women

Elite

See also
Belgian National Time Trial Championships
National road cycling championships
Belgium at the UCI Road World Championships

References

External links
Men's results on the Cycling Website
Women's results on the Cycling Website
Cycle Base results

National road cycling championships
Cycle races in Belgium
Recurring sporting events established in 1894
Road race
1894 establishments in Belgium